Radosław Aleksander Fogiel (born 16 February 1982) is a Polish politician. He is a Member of the Masovian Regional Assembly, the Deputy Chairman of the European Young Conservatives, and an Advisor to Law and Justice Leader Jarosław Kaczyński.

Biography
Fogiel was born on 16 February 1982 in Radom, Poland. He was elected to the Radom City Council in 2006. He became a Member of the Masovian Regional Assembly in 2014. He is the Vice Chairman of the Committee on Agriculture. Fogiel is a close associate of Jarosław Kaczyński, the Leader of Law and Justice. He is Kaczyński's Advisor and Chief of Staff. Fogiel is also Law and Justice's International Secretary and is part of the party's national leadership. He serves as Deputy Chairman of the European Young Conservatives, having previously been Secretary-General.

References

1982 births
Living people
Law and Justice politicians
Members of the Polish Sejm 2019–2023